Norman Piper (born 8 January 1948) is an English former professional footballer who played in England for 13 years before finishing his career in the United States.

Playing career
Born in North Tawton, Devon on 8 January 1948 he joined Plymouth Argyle as an apprentice and signed professional terms in February 1965. Already an England Youth international, Piper made his debut for the Under 23 side in 1970 against Bulgaria, the year he left The Pilgrims- for whom he scored 35 goals in 221 appearances. That summer Piper had signed for Portsmouth, becoming their record signing at £50,000. Piper served Pompey with great distinction during the clubs increasingly tenuous hold on Division Two status, but eventually lost form after relegation to the third. He was dropped in February 1978, being replaced by his namesake Steve Piper. His contract, along with that of Bobby Stokes was terminated the following month.

Soon after his departure from Portsmouth, a move to the Fort Lauderdale Strikers followed. In 1979, Piper was the first player signed by the expansion Wichita Wings of Major Indoor Soccer League. He played for the Wings until 1982 when he was sent to the Pittsburgh Spirit.

Coaching career
Following his retirement from playing, he became and assistant coach with the Wichita Wings. He was fired on 30 January 1988. In 1989, he was hired to coach the Wichita Blue in the Heartland Soccer League. In 1990, the Blue moved to the Lone Star Soccer Alliance. He was fired mid-season. He coached the men's soccer team at Bethel College (Kansas) from 1988 to 1990. He now is a coach for a small travel soccer team in Southern California known as TVSA Hawks

Style of play
Piper was one of that generation who bridged the gap between terminological eras, beginning his career as a wing half and ending it as a midfielder despite playing a similar role throughout.

References

External links
 Talents unearthed by Argyle's scouts
 Piper scores for Pompey in Cup game versus Boston
 Piper tracked down in the U.S.A
 NASL/MISL stats

1948 births
American Soccer League (1933–1983) players
Columbus Magic players
England under-23 international footballers
English footballers
English expatriate footballers
Fort Lauderdale Strikers (1977–1983) players
Lone Star Soccer Alliance coaches
Major Indoor Soccer League (1978–1992) coaches
Major Indoor Soccer League (1978–1992) players
North American Soccer League (1968–1984) players
People from the Borough of West Devon
Plymouth Argyle F.C. players
Portsmouth F.C. players
Yeovil Town F.C. players
Pittsburgh Spirit players
Living people
Wichita Wings (MISL) players
England youth international footballers
Association football midfielders
English expatriate sportspeople in the United States
Expatriate soccer players in the United States
English football managers
Lusitano F.C. (South Africa) players